Bahariyeh (also Romanized as Bahārīyeh) is a village in Qaleh-ye Bala Rural District, in the Farah Dasht District of Kashmar County, Razavi Khorasan Province, Iran. At the 2006 census, its population was 115, in 29 families.

See also 

 List of cities, towns and villages in Razavi Khorasan Province

References 

Populated places in Kashmar County